Adeptus Titanicus is a tabletop science fiction mecha game published by Games Workshop (GW) in 1988 for use with the rules of Warhammer 40,000. Several revised and expanded editions were released from 1994 to 2018.

Description
Adeptus Titanicus is a turn-based tabletop wargame for two or more players who control 6sm scale models of giant walking titans.

The game (AT18) is usually played on a 4x4' area and uses alternating activations.

Publication history

First edition (Adeptus Titanicus)
In an attempt to counter to the increasing popularity of FASA's Battletech, GW published Adeptus Titanicus in 1988, a science fiction tabletop game designed by Jervis Johnson that features combat between "Imperial Titans" in the popular Warhammer 40,000 universe. The game comes with: 
six 6sm scale "Battle Titans" with interchangeable weapons
eight polystyrene buildings
diecut counters
a scale ruler
various dice
Titan cards
60-page rulebook
The combat system uses the "all move, all fire" system, where all moves by all units are resolved in order from fastest to slowest, and then fire results are resolved, with slowest units firing first.
  
The following year, GW released a companion game, Space Marines, another miniatures and rules set (for two opposing Space Marine armies) that could be played separately or in conjunction with Adeptus Titanicus. Numerous articles supporting the Adeptus Titanicus/Space Marine game were released in GW's White Dwarf, including a variety of optional rules, army lists and organizational charts.

Second edition (Titan Legions)
In 1994 GW released a second edition retitled Titan Legions, as well as a second edition of Space Marine, the two again published as compatible but stand-alone games. Various supplements were also produced between 1992–1994. GW also released many metal miniatures for use with both games.

Third edition (Epic 40,000)
The third edition by designers Jervis Johnson and Andy Chambers was retitled Epic 40,000 and released in 1997. In contrast to the previous two editions, this was released as just one set of rules. The game had a very short period of support (six months) from the company before it was withdrawn. Epic 40,000 never enjoyed the popularity of the previous two editions, and after support was reduced many of the miniatures planned for Epic 40,000 were never released.

Though it was not a commercial success for GW, designers Jervis Johnson and Andy Chambers still maintained that it was the best set of rules they conceived for this series, believing that this edition most rewarded good tactics over luck and special abilities.

Fourth edition (Adeptus Titanicus: The Horus Heresy)
In 2018, GW released Adeptus Titanicus: The Horus Heresy, designed by James Hewitt, and set during the Horus Heresy, 10,000 years before the main Warhammer 40,000 storyline. Several expansions were released between 2019 and 2022.

Reception
In the April 1989 edition of Games International (Issue 4), James Wallis reviewed the first edition of Adeptus Titanicus, and although he found the rules "well prepared, laid out systematically and simply, and illustrated throughout by reference to an ongoing battle between two Titans", he soon found some issues with the combat rules, including lack of clarity about line of sight, lack of specific targeting of body parts, a random critical hit system, and close combat that was far deadlier than combat at medium range. He found the components themselves were average in production value, and the models of Titans to be quite fragile when clipped together. As he pointed out, "Glue is clearly needed, but that means you can't change the weapons or remove them if destroyed during the game, as the rulebook instructs." He concluded by giving the game a below-average rating of only 2 out of 5, saying, "Adeptus Titanicus is a flawed game. [...] It is not an inherently bad game, just a poor one."

In a January 2020 review in the Dicebreaker website, Luke Shaw called Adeptus Titanicus: The Horus Legacy "Games Workshop's best game [...]  a slick, modern reimagining of one of Games Workshop’s oldest games, 1988’s identically-named Adeptus Titanicus." He concluded, "By avoiding weighing the system down with rules that tried to approximate interactions between mechs that can crush a tank column underfoot without a hitch, Titanicus became a game where the back and forth of gigantic god-engines feels palpable and exciting."

Reviews
Jeux & Stratégie #58

References

External links 
 Warhammer community pages dedicated to Adeptus Titanicus
 Adeptus Titanicus at Boardgame geek

Warhammer 40,000 tabletop games
Games Workshop games